The Long Life of Saint Gerard, also known as Long Life of Saint Gerald or Passion of Saint Gerard, is the hagiography of Bishop Gerard of Csanád, who was murdered by pagan Hungarians in 1046. The longer version of his legends was compiled from earlier sources in the early .

Bishop St Gerard 

Gerard was born in Venice in or shortly after 977. His father was a member of the Morosini or Sagredo family.

Manuscripts and editions 

The text was preserved in two codices. The other manuscript is an almost verbatim copy of the older codex. The first manuscript is held in the Austrian National Library in Vienna, the other codex in the Munich Public Library. Other variants of the text also existed because a 16th-century legend of St Gerard, published in Venice, was
based on a version different from the ones preserved in the two codices.

Sources 

The Long Life of Saint Gerard is an early-14th-century compilation of multiple sources, including family legends.

Text 

The first three chapters of the Legend narrates the would-be saint's early life.

See also

Footnotes

Sources 

 

Gerard of Csanád
Medieval documents of Hungary